Bolla Bulli Ramaiah (9 July 1926 – 14 February 2018) was an Indian politician who was elected to the 8th, 9th, 10th and 12th Lok Sabhas of the Parliament of India from the Eluru constituency in Andhra Pradesh. He was born in Tatipaka, East Godavari district, Andhra Pradesh.

Ramaiah served as a Union Minister and was a member of the Telugu Desam Party.

References

1938 births
2018 deaths
People from East Godavari district
India MPs 1984–1989
India MPs 1989–1991
India MPs 1991–1996
India MPs 1998–1999
Andhra Pradesh politicians
Lok Sabha members from Andhra Pradesh
Telugu Desam Party politicians
Commerce and Industry Ministers of India